This is a list of films produced in Sweden and in the Swedish language in the 1920s. For an A-Z see :Category:Swedish films.

1920

1921

1922

1923

1924

1925

1926

1927

1928

1929

References

External links
 Swedish Film Database
 Most Popular Titles Released 1920-01-01 to 1929-12-31 With Country of Origin Sweden at the Internet Movie Database

1920s
Films
Swedish